Simon F. Wehrwein, Jr. (January 9, 1869 – July 14, 1938) was a farmer, teacher, and politician.

Born in the town of Newton, Manitowoc County, Wisconsin, Wehrwein worked on the family farm and went to Oshkosh Normal School. He then taught school in Mequon, Wisconsin and rural Manitowoc County. He was involved with the Manitowoc County Teachers Association and was on the board of common schools examiners. Wehrwein was also involved in the fire insurance industry. Wehrwein served in the Wisconsin State Assembly from 1905 to 1911 and was a Republican. Later, Wehrwein was active with the Wisconsin Progressive Party. He died in a hospital in Madison, Wisconsin from a heart ailment.

Notes

1869 births
1938 deaths
People from Newton, Manitowoc County, Wisconsin
University of Wisconsin–Oshkosh alumni
Businesspeople from Wisconsin
Educators from Wisconsin
Farmers from Wisconsin
Wisconsin Progressives (1924)
20th-century American politicians
Republican Party members of the Wisconsin State Assembly